Arabic is the official language of Syria and is the most widely spoken language in the country. Several modern Arabic dialects are used in everyday life, most notably Levantine in the west and Mesopotamian in the northeast.
According to The Encyclopedia of Arabic Language and Linguistics, in addition to Arabic, the following languages are spoken in the country, in order of the number of speakers: Kurdish, Turkish, Neo-Aramaic (four dialects), Circassian, Chechen, Armenian, and finally Greek. None of these languages has official status.

Historically, Aramaic was the lingua franca of the region before the advent of Arabic and is still spoken among Assyrians, and Classical Syriac is still used as the liturgical language of various Syriac Christian denominations.

Syrian Sign Language is the principal language of the deaf community.

Arabic

Modern Standard Arabic is the language of education and writing. At home, most Syrians speak various dialects of Levantine Arabic with Damascus Arabic being the prestigious dialect in the media. Dialects of the cities of Damascus, Homs, Hama and Tartous are more similar to each other than to that of the northern region of Aleppo. Allied dialects are spoken in the coastal mountains.

Lebanese Arabic together with Syrian are classified as North Levantine Arabic (ISO 639-3 language code apc). Lebanese is similar especially to the southern Syrian dialects, though it has more influence from Palestinian Arabic.

Due to Syria's long history of multiculturalism and foreign imperialism, Syrian Arabic exhibits a vocabulary stratum that includes word borrowings from Turkish, Kurdish, Armenian, Syriac, English, French and Persian. There is no standardized spelling, but usually it is written in Arabic alphabet from right to left.

Other forms of Arabic natively spoken in Syria include:
the dialect spoken in the Jabal al-Druze (Jabal Al-Arab) mountains;
the eastern dialect group (Al-Hasakah, Al-Raqqah, and Deir ez-Zor), part of Mesopotamian Arabic (rarely called "North Syrian Arabic");
Shawi Arabic, spoken by sheep-rearing Bedouin
Najdi Arabic, spoken by the Rwala tribe.
Non-indigenous dialects of Arabic, most notably those of Iraq and Palestine, are frequently used within their respective refugee diasporas, especially in Damascus.

Kurdish

Kurdish (specifically Kurmanji) is the second most spoken language in Syria. It is spoken particularly in the northeast and northwest of the country within the Kurdish minority.

Turkish

Turkish is the third most widely used language in Syria. Various Turkish dialects are spoken by the Turkmen/Turkoman minority mostly in villages east of the Euphrates and along the Syrian-Turkish border. In addition, there are Turkish language islands in the Qalamun area and the Homs area.

Moreover, Syrian Arabic dialects have borrowed many loanwords from Turkish, particularly during Ottoman rule.

Aramaic

Four dialects of Neo-Aramaic are spoken in Syria. West Neo-Aramaic is spoken in three villages near Damascus (including Maaloula). Turoyo speakers from Tur Abdin have settled in the province of Al-Hasakah.  There is also a relatively large linguistic island formed by the Assyrians along the Khabur River. Moreover, Chaldean speakers are found in the northeast of Syria.

Circassian

Circassian languages are spoken in some villages south of Aleppo, as well as in the Homs area and on the Golan Heights. In particular, Kabardian is spoken by the Circassian minority.

Chechen

The Chechen language is spoken by the Chechen minority in two villages on the Khabur River.

Armenian

The Armenian language is spoken within the Armenian community in Aleppo and other major cities, such as Damascus and in one small town exclusively in Kessab. Although Syria does not recognise any minority languages, the Armenians are the only community allowed to teach in their own language, in addition to Arabic.

Greek

There is also a small number of Greek speakers in Syria. The Greek language is spoken in Al-Hamidiyah by Cretan Muslims. Their demand to be allowed to teach Greek in their schools has been rejected by the State with the argument that they are Muslims.

Foreign languages
English and French are also spoken by Syrian citizens, mostly in urban centers and among the educated.

References

 
North Levantine Arabic
Articles containing video clips